Monumental Río Parapití is a multi-use stadium in  the city of Pedro Juan Caballero, Paraguay, used mostly for football. It is the home venue of Club 2 de Mayo.

This stadium was used during the 1999 Copa América, hosting games between Paraguay and Peru and between Japan and Bolivia.

See also
List of association football stadiums by capacity

References

Multi-purpose stadiums in Paraguay
Football venues in Paraguay
Athletics (track and field) venues in Paraguay
Copa América stadiums
Amambay Department